Dato Seri Paduka Steven Chong Wan Oon is a Brunei magistrate who was appointed chief justice of the Supreme Court of Brunei Darussalam in 2018.

Early years

Steven Chong Wan Oon was educated at St George’s School Brunei.
He obtained a Bachelor of Arts degree at the Dorset Institute of Higher Education. 
A year later he passed the Inns of Court School of Law examination to become a barrister of Lincoln's Inn in London.
He became  a magistrate in the Subordinate Court of Brunei in 1984.
He was promoted to High Court judge in 2001.

Chief Justice

The Sultan of Brunei, Sultan Hassanal Bolkiah, appointed Steven Chong as chief justice of the Supreme Court as of 30 June 2018.
Chong replaced Dato Seri Paduka Haji Kifrawi bin Kifli, who had been chief justice for nine years.
On 16 July 2019 the Sultan invested Chong into the Order of Seri Paduka Mahkota Brunei First Class, which carries the title "Dato Seri Paduka".

In July 2019 Chong was awarded the International Jurists Award 2019, presented by Adish C. Aggarwala, President of the International Council of Jurists.
At the ceremony Richard Lindsay, British High Commissioner to Brunei Darussalam, expressed his appreciation to the International Council of Jurists for their work across the world in the development of justice and equality.
In January 2020 Chong announced media guidelines to “Promote transparency and the principle of open justice; facilitate fair and accurate reporting of matters before the court; and enhance public understanding of the court’s function and its work.”
He also introduced a judicial conduct and ethics handbook giving guidelines for the conduct of judges and judicial officers.

Notes

References

Chief justices of Brunei
Bruneian people of Chinese descent
Year of birth missing (living people)
Living people